The Nier: Automata Church (stylized as The NieR: Automata Church) is a mod for the Windows version of Nier: Automata developed by the trio of DevolasRevenge, Woeful_Wolf and RaiderB, and released on September 6, 2022. The mod adds a secret church area to the game, accessible from its Copied City area via a hidden door, featuring references to the series.

It gained notoriety due to its initial reveal on the social news website Reddit, where it was presented as a possible Easter egg left in the game by director Yoko Taro by a confused player who accidentally unlocked it. This claim was made more believable by Yoko's history of adding Easter eggs to his games, including Automata itself, and the fact that it was supposedly impossible to mod the game at that point, leading to a large collaborative effort by the game's fans to find the conditions to trigger it. The hoax was eventually revealed on July 29, 2022, via a Twitch stream held by its creators, who then released the modding tools they used to develop it.

Hoax 
The hoax originated in a "cryptic post" left on Reddit by user "sadfutago" on June 15, 2022, who asked how to open a church in Nier: Automata, claiming their friend could not open it. However, the area was never before seen and inaccessible to other players. The user continued to follow up with more pictures and videos of the secret area, with one Redditor calling it a "god tier and impressive hoax" if it was fake. Fans ultimately asked Yoko Taro on Twitter to clarify whether he had secretly added it to the game, something made more believable by the fact that a "hyperspecific" cheat code had previously been discovered in 2021 that was later officially confirmed. However, Yoko refused to comment, pointing fans to his policy of directing any questions about his games to his publisher.

The fan community made "extensive" efforts to discover how to unlock it, with the efforts being chronicled on Twitter by Lyn and Viera, two Nier fans. "Bloby", an enemy composed of a dark mass that could be battled within the church, became an "icon" to fans. Many fans believed it might have been an alternate reality game. However, on July 29, 2022, the mod's creators held a Twitch stream where they revealed that it was developed by fans. They also apologized to the community for misleading people, stating that they did not intend to give the impression the church was an ARG or that they wanted to impersonate Yoko Taro. Nevertheless, the hoax was called a net positive for the game and its fans, as it gained the attention of numerous people from outside the community.

Development 
The mod's creators called it surprisingly challenging to make, saying the engine was difficult to work with and never "played along". The team came under more intense pressure when the mod gained large amounts of attention. They put together new content "on the fly", knowing that the hoax could be ended with one mistake.

Reception 
After its release, Ryan Leston of IGN called the mod beautiful and impressive, noting that it opened up new possibilities for Nier modding in the future. Jenny Zheng of Rock Paper Shotgun called the mod's resolution "eerily similar" to the true ending of Nier: Automata, where players could choose to work together.

References 

Nier:_Automata_Church
Nier:_Automata_Church
Nier:_Automata_Church
Nier:_Automata_Church